Steyermark is:

A historical spelling of Steiermark, the German name for the former duchy and current state and region of Styria
A surname
Julian Alfred Steyermark, an American botanist whose standard author abbreviation is Steyerm.